Sporus was a young slave boy whom the Roman Emperor Nero favored, had castrated, and married.

Life 
Little is known about Sporus' background except that he was a youth to whom Nero took a liking. He may have been a puer delicatus, who were sometimes castrated to preserve their youthful qualities.
The puer delicatus generally was a child-slave chosen by his master for his beauty and sexual attractiveness. Cassius Dio identifies Sporus as the child of a freedman.

Marriage to Nero 

Nero's wife, Poppaea Sabina, died in 65 AD. This was supposedly in childbirth, although it was later rumored Nero kicked her to death. At the beginning of 66, Nero married Statilia Messalina. Later that year or in 67, he married Sporus, who was said to bear a remarkable resemblance to Poppaea.

Nero had Sporus castrated, and during their marriage, Nero had Sporus appear in public as his wife wearing the regalia that was customary for Roman empresses. He then took Sporus to Greece and back to Rome, making Calvia Crispinilla serve as "mistress of the wardrobe" to Sporus, epitropeia ten peri estheta. Nero had earlier married another freedman, Pythagoras, who had played the role of Nero's husband; now Sporus played the role of Nero's wife. Among other forms of address, Sporus was termed "Lady", "Empress", and "Mistress". Suetonius quotes one Roman who lived around this time who remarked that the world would have been better off if Nero's father Gnaeus Domitius Ahenobarbus had married someone more like the castrated boy.

Suetonius places his account of the Nero–Sporus relationship in his scandalous accounts of Nero's sexual aberrations, between his raping a Vestal Virgin and committing incest with his mother. Some think Nero used his marriage to Sporus to assuage the guilt he felt for kicking his pregnant wife Poppaea to death. Dio Cassius, in a more detailed account, writes that Sporus bore an uncanny resemblance to Poppaea and that Nero called Sporus by her name.

Shortly before Nero's death, during the Calends festival, Sporus presented Nero with a ring bearing a gemstone depicting the Rape of Proserpina, in which the ruler of the underworld forces a young girl to become his bride. It was at the time considered one of the many bad omens of Nero's fall.

Sporus was one of the four companions on the emperor's last journey in June 68, along with Epaphroditus, Neophytus, and Phaon. It was Sporus, and not his wife Messalina, to whom Nero turned as he began the ritual lamentations before taking his own life.

After Nero and death 

Soon afterward, Sporus was taken to the care of the Praetorian prefect Nymphidius Sabinus, who had persuaded the Praetorian Guard to desert Nero. Nymphidius treated Sporus as a wife and called him "Poppaea". Nymphidius tried to make himself emperor but was killed by his own guardsmen.

In 69, Sporus became involved with Otho, the second of a rapid, violent succession of four emperors who vied for power during the chaos that followed Nero's death. (Otho had once been married to Poppaea, until Nero had forced their divorce.) Otho reigned for three months until his suicide after the Battle of Bedriacum. His victorious rival, Vitellius, intended to use Sporus as a victim in a public entertainment: a fatal "re-enactment" of the Rape of Proserpina at a gladiator show. Sporus avoided this public humiliation by committing suicide.

In fiction 
In 1735, Alexander Pope wrote a satirical poem that mocked the courtier Lord Hervey, who had been accused of homosexuality a few years earlier. He scoffs at using so strong a weapon as satire upon a weak and effeminate target like Sporus, "that mere white curd of ass's milk", and in a famous line Pope poses the rhetorical question: "Who breaks a butterfly upon a wheel?"

The fourth episode of Season 3 of the TV show Succession features Tom Wambsgans recounting the marriage of Nero and Sporus to Greg Hirsch. He once again refers to Greg as Sporus in the Season 3 finale.

See also 
History of same-sex unions
Homosexuality in ancient Rome
Pythagoras (freedman)
Who breaks a butterfly upon a wheel?

Notes

References

Bibliography 
 Dion Cassius. Ixii. 28, Ixiii. 12, 13, 27, Ixiv. 8, Ixv. 10;
 Suetonius. Nero. 28, 46, 48, 49;
 Sextus Aurelius Victor. De Caesaribus. 5, Epit. 5;
 Dion Chrysostom. Oratio. xxi;
 Suidas, s. v. "Sporus”
 
 
 

1st-century births
1st-century Romans
69 deaths
Ancient Romans who committed suicide
Castrated people
Emperor's slaves and freedmen
Spouses of Nero
Husbands of Roman emperors
Male lovers of royalty
Claudii
Poppaea Sabina